Whitwell railway station  serves the village of Whitwell in Derbyshire, England. The station is on the Robin Hood Line 4¾ miles (7 km) south west of Worksop towards Nottingham.

History
The line and station were built by the Midland Railway. The station was designed by the Midland Railway company architect John Holloway Sanders. They were opened for passenger traffic on 1 June 1875. When the line opened two railway companies provided services through Whitwell:
 The Midland Railway (MR) ran three trains a day from Mansfield through Whitwell, which then turned right at Woodend Junction to Worksop, as all Robin Hood Line trains do now.
 The Manchester, Sheffield and Lincolnshire Railway (MSLR) ran three daily trains from Mansfield through Whitwell which turned left at Woodend Junction to  then several stops to their station in Sheffield, later to be renamed .

Over time the direct Mansfield-Whitwell-Sheffield service was diverted to Worksop. From 1 October 1905 the MR took over all services and ran them all to Worksop, where passengers for Sheffield could change trains. This core service continued until closure for passenger traffic in October 1964, though freight traffic continued. The station was dismantled and rebuilt, brick by brick, at the heritage railway at Butterley in 1981.

The line reopened in stages through the 1990s, with the final, northernmost, section from  through Whitwell to  reopening in 1998. The modern Whitwell station is on the original site, but a wholly new structure.

Stationmasters

George Boulter 1876 - 1881  (formerly station master at Kingsbury)
William Frederick Best 1882 - 1895 (formerly station master at Penns, afterwards station master at Codnor Park and Ironville)
Samuel Oughton 1895 - 1921 (formerly station master at Widmerpool)
Leo Davis 1921 - 1922 (formerly station master at Clowne)
Richard Pratt 1923 - 1931 (afterwards station master at Ripley)
W. Edwards 1931 - 1939 (afterwards station master at Kirkby-in-Ashfield)
Harold Doxey 1944 - 1955 (formerly station master at Great Barr)
Norman Sigsworth from 1955  (formerly station master at Sedgebrook)

The station
The station is located on the edge of the village, beside the quarry.  It consists of two platforms, with the Nottingham bound one having to be reached via a foot-bridge.

Services
All services at Whitwell are operated by East Midlands Railway.

There is currently no Sunday service at the station since the previous service of four trains per day was withdrawn in 2011. Sunday services at the station are due to recommence at the station during the life of the East Midlands franchise.

References

Notes

Sources

External links

Railway stations in Derbyshire
DfT Category F2 stations
Former Midland Railway stations
Railway stations in Great Britain opened in 1875
Railway stations in Great Britain closed in 1964
Railway stations in Great Britain opened in 1998
Railway stations served by East Midlands Railway
Beeching closures in England
Reopened railway stations in Great Britain